Terry Poindexter Gautreaux  was a former US Olympian who competed in taekwondo.

Poindexter started competing in 1987 and won gold in the Student World Championships. She competed in the 1992 Olympic Games earning a bronze medal in the 132 lbs division.

She married her instructor Oren  Gautreaux. She was reported as being from both Iowa and Independence, Missouri.

References

American female taekwondo practitioners
Taekwondo practitioners at the 1992 Summer Olympics
Medalists at the 1992 Summer Olympics
Living people
Year of birth missing (living people)
Olympic bronze medalists for the United States in taekwondo
21st-century American women